The discography of English singer-songwriter and former member of the Beatles, George Harrison consists of 12 studio albums, two live albums, four compilation albums, 35 singles, two video albums and four box sets (one of which is with Indian classical musician Ravi Shankar). Harrison's first solo releases – the Wonderwall Music film soundtrack (1968) and Electronic Sound (1969) – were almost entirely instrumental works, issued during the last two years of the Beatles' career. Following the band's break-up in April 1970, Harrison continued to produce recordings by his fellow Apple Records acts, notably former bandmate Ringo Starr. He recorded and collaborated with a wide range of artists, including Shankar, Bob Dylan, Eric Clapton and Gary Wright.

Harrison's acclaimed triple album All Things Must Pass (1970) was certified six-times platinum by the Recording Industry Association of America (RIAA) in March 2001 and, as of 2011, was still the most successful album by an ex-Beatle. All Things Must Pass produced the international number 1 hit "My Sweet Lord", which was coupled as a double A-side with "Isn't It a Pity" in the majority of countries. In 1971 Harrison recorded pop music's first charity single, "Bangla Desh", and released the Concert for Bangladesh triple live album (credited to George Harrison & Friends) to raise further funds for refugees of the Bangladesh Liberation War. His 1973 album Living in the Material World and the single "Give Me Love (Give Me Peace on Earth)" repeated the US success of his 1970 solo releases by simultaneously holding the number 1 position on Billboard'''s albums and singles charts. The remainder of his 1970s studio albums, starting with Dark Horse (1974), were all certified gold by the RIAA but performed disappointingly on the UK albums chart. Following the expiration of his EMI-affiliated Apple contract, Thirty Three & 1/3 (1976) was Harrison's debut release on his Dark Horse label, distributed worldwide by Warner Bros. Records.

The 1981 single "All Those Years Ago", from Somewhere in England, was written as a tribute to the recently murdered John Lennon and became Harrison's biggest chart hit since "Give Me Love". Having clashed with Warner Bros. over the content of that album, Harrison refused to participate in promotion for Gone Troppo (1982), resulting in lacklustre sales. From 1983 until 1986, Harrison released only film soundtrack singles, reflecting his involvement in movie production. Cloud Nine (1987) and its lead single "Got My Mind Set on You" marked a commercial comeback for Harrison. He then formed the Traveling Wilburys with Dylan, Jeff Lynne, Tom Petty and Roy Orbison, and the band released two successful studio albums between 1988 and 1990 on his Warner Bros. contract. Following his tour that resulted in the 1992 Live in Japan album, Harrison again stepped back from full-time musical activity. After being diagnosed with throat cancer in 1997, he recorded his twelfth and final studio album, the posthumously released Brainwashed (2002). Harrison oversaw the reissue of All Things Must Pass in January 2001, and 2014 saw the completion of his remastered catalogue with the release of The Apple Years 1968–75.

 Albums 
 Studio albums 

 Live albums 

 Compilation albums 

 Box sets 

 Singles 

Promotional singles
The following is a list of songs by Harrison that were released as promotional singles in the United States, showing their peak positions on Billboards Adult Contemporary and Mainstream Rock listings, where applicable.

Billboard Year-End performances

 Video albums 

 Contributions to multi-artist compilations 

 Collaborations and other appearances 

 See also 
 The Beatles discography
 Ringo Starr discography
 Traveling Wilburys discography

 Citations 

 Sources 

 Keith Badman, The Beatles Diary Volume 2: After the Break-Up 1970–2001, Omnibus Press (London, 2001).
 Harry Castleman & Walter J. Podrazik, All Together Now: The First Complete Beatles Discography 1961–1975, Ballantine Books (New York, NY, 1976).
 Alan Clayson, George Harrison, Sanctuary (London, 2003).
 The Editors of Rolling Stone, Harrison, Rolling Stone Press/Simon & Schuster (New York, NY, 2002).
 Walter Everett, The Beatles as Musicians: Revolver through the Anthology, Oxford University Press (New York, NY, 1999).
 Clinton Heylin, Bob Dylan: Behind the Shades (20th Anniversary Edition), Faber and Faber (London, 2011).
 Ian Inglis, The Words and Music of George Harrison, Praeger (Santa Barbara, CA, 2010).
 Peter Lavezzoli, The Dawn of Indian Music in the West, Continuum (New York, NY, 2006).
 Simon Leng, While My Guitar Gently Weeps: The Music of George Harrison, Hal Leonard (Milwaukee, WI, 2006).
 Chip Madinger & Mark Easter, Eight Arms to Hold You: The Solo Beatles Compendium, 44.1 Productions (Chesterfield, MO, 2000).
 Robert Rodriguez, Fab Four FAQ 2.0: The Beatles' Solo Years, 1970–1980, Backbeat Books (Milwaukee, WI, 2010).
 Ravi Shankar, Raga Mala: The Autobiography of Ravi Shankar, Welcome Rain (New York, NY, 1999).
 Bruce Spizer, The Beatles Solo on Apple Records, 498 Productions (New Orleans, LA, 2005).
 Gary Tillery, Working Class Mystic: A Spiritual Biography of George Harrison, Quest Books (Wheaton, IL, 2011).
 John C. Winn, That Magic Feeling: The Beatles' Recorded Legacy, Volume Two, 1966–1970, Three Rivers Press (New York, NY, 2009).
 Gary Wright, Dream Weaver: A Memoir; Music, Meditation, and My Friendship with George Harrison'', Tarcher/Penguin (New York, NY, 2014).

External links

Discography
Rock music discographies
Discographies of British artists